Plum Creek is a  stream near the city of Walnut Grove, Minnesota. It passes to the northwest of the town, flowing northeasterly to the Cottonwood River, with its waters then flowing to the Minnesota River and eventually the Mississippi River. Plum Creek lends its name to a regional library network.

History
Plum Creek was so named on account of the wild plum (Prunus americana) trees along its course. It was known to the native Sioux as Kaŋ-ta-'o-ta ("plenty of plums").

It is known for being close to the homestead of the Ingalls family of Little House on the Prairie fame, and features in the book On the Banks of Plum Creek. It is also mentioned in the sixth Little House on the Prairie book.

See also
List of rivers of Minnesota
List of longest streams of Minnesota

References

External links
Frontier Girl Trail - Plum Creek

Rivers of Minnesota
Rivers of Murray County, Minnesota
Rivers of Redwood County, Minnesota
Tributaries of the Mississippi River